Ernest E. Newman served as Mayor of Red Deer, Alberta from 1961 until his resignation in 1965. Before being elected as mayor in 1961 to succeed a retiring J. M. McAfee, Newman had been the city's commissioner.

Born in London in 1914, he moved to Canada in 1940. He died in 1977.

References

1914 births
1977 deaths
Mayors of Red Deer, Alberta
20th-century Canadian politicians